Harry Dale may refer to:

 Harry H. Dale (1868–1935), U.S. Representative from New York
 Harry Dale (footballer) (1899–1985), English association (soccer) football goalkeeper
 Harry Dale (rugby league) (1908/09–1970), English rugby league footballer who played in the 1920s and 1930s

See also  
 Henry Dale (disambiguation)